Resource Based Economy may refer to:

 Resource-based economy - economies based on natural resources
 The Venus Project and The Zeitgeist Movement - which propose the post-scarcity 'resource based economy' as an alternative to the current (monetary-based) system